Rud Darreh (also Romanized as Rūd Darreh, Rood Darreh, and Rūd-e Darreh; also known as Rū Darreh and Ruidarreh) is a village in Arabkhaneh Rural District, Shusef District, Nehbandan County, South Khorasan Province, Iran. At the 2006 census, its population was 88, in 23 families.

References 

Populated places in Nehbandan County